Debbie Carr (born 23 August 1977) is a South African former cricketer who played as a right-arm pace bowler. She appeared in two One Day Internationals for South Africa in 1999.

References

External links
 
 

1977 births
Living people
South African women cricketers
South Africa women One Day International cricketers